Andika , from the verb root for 'to write' in Swahili, is a sans-serif typeface developed by SIL International for the Latin, Greek and Cyrillic scripts. It is designed for literacy programs and beginning readers, but also has support for IPA transcription and a large number of diacritics. The font offers four family members: roman, bold, italic and bold italic.

Andika supports OpenType and AAT technologies for advanced rendering features. It is licensed under the SIL Open Font License (OFL), and can be downloaded free of charge.

Version 6.2 of the font, with over 3,800 glyphs are included, including stylistic variants and ligatures. Stylistic variants include primer-style forms of letters such as a, g and t  and the digit 4. The Andika New Basic variant has a reduced number of characters and a significantly smaller file size.

Variant forms of many characters can be chosen in the word-processor. For example, for non-primer-style 'a' and 'g', append ss01=1 to the name of the font in the font-selection window. (Features are appended with a colon and linked with an ampersand – see images at left.) Alternatively, customized versions of the fonts can be created with TypeTuner, prior to download, that have those forms preset. Features that may be chosen include two-storey 'a', loop-tail 'g', open-top '4', barred '7', 'i' and 'l' with a bottom curl, variant forms of capital 'Ŋ', capital 'Q' with a crossing tail,  primer-style 't', 'y' with a straight tail, Vietnamese-style diacritics, Serbian-style italics in Cyrillic, staveless tone letters, slashed zero and automatic fractions.

References

External links
Andika homepage
TypeTuner Web homepage

Sans-serif typefaces
Free software Unicode typefaces
IPA typefaces